Marengo Wind Farm is an electricity generating wind farm facility located near Dayton, Washington, United States. It is owned by PacifiCorp and began operations in 2007. The facility has a generating capacity of 140 megawatts.

See also

List of wind farms in the United States
Wind power in Washington

References

External links
 https://web.archive.org/web/20100416052945/http://renewableenergydev.com/red/wind-power-marengo-ii-wind-farm/ 
Wind farm photos on Flickr
Puget Sound Energy: map of wind farm (PDF)

Buildings and structures in Columbia County, Washington
Wind farms in Washington (state)
Energy infrastructure completed in 2007